Lanfranchi is an Italian surname. Notable people with the surname include:

Agostino Lanfranchi (1892–1963), Italian bobsledder and skeleton racer
Andreas Lanfranchi (died 1659), Roman Catholic prelate, Bishop of Ugento
Angela Lanfranchi (born 1950), American breast cancer surgeon
Antonio Lanfranchi (1946–2015), Roman Catholic Archbishop
Gaetano Lanfranchi (1901–1983), Italian bobsledder
Giovanni Battista Lanfranchi (1606–1673), Roman Catholic prelate, Bishop of Avellino e Frigento
Jacques Lanfranchi (1957), French sport shooter
Jean-Paul Lanfranchi (born 1951), French lawyer and businessman
Lanfranc of Milan (c. 1250–1306), variously called Guido Lanfranchi, Lanfranco or Alanfrancus, Italian surgeon
Luigi Lanfranchi (1914–date of death unknown), Italian field hockey player
Mario Lanfranchi (1927–2022), Italian film, theatre and television director
Stefano Lanfranchi (1977), Italian Music producer
Paolo Lanfranchi (born 1968), Italian cyclist
Paolo Lanfranchi da Pistoia (fl. 1282–1295), Italian poet
Pietro Lanfranchi (born 1978), Italian ski mountaineer
Tony Lanfranchi (1935–2004), British racing driver
Ubaldo Lanfranchi (died 1207), Italian Roman Catholic Archbishop
Roberta Lanfranchi (1974), Italian radio speaker
Uberto Lanfranchi (died 1137), Italian Roman Catholic Archbishop and cardinal
Vincenzo Lanfranchi (1609–1676), Roman Catholic prelate, Archbishop of Acerenza e Matera and Bishop of Trivento

Italian-language surnames